Sturt, an electoral district of the Legislative Assembly in the Australian state of New South Wales, had two incarnations, from 1889 until 1968 and from 1971 until 1981.


Election results

Elections in the 1980s

1981 by-election

Elections in the 1970s

1978

1976

1973

1971

1968 - 1971
District abolished

Elections in the 1960s

1965

1962

Elections in the 1950s

1959

1956

1953

1950

Elections in the 1940s

1947

1944

1941

Elections in the 1930s

1938

1935

1932

1930

Elections in the 1920s

1927

1925

1922 appointment
Jabez Wright died on 10 September 1922. Ted Horsington was the only unsuccessful Labor candidate at the 1922 election and took his seat on 20 September 1922.

1922

1921 appointment
On 22 March 1921 Percy Brookfield was murdered while trying to disarm a deranged man at Riverton. Between 1920 and 1927 the Legislative Assembly was elected using a form of proportional representation with multi-member seats and a single transferable vote (modified Hare-Clark). The Parliamentary Elections (Casual Vacancies) Act, provided that casual vacancies were filled by the next unsuccessful candidate "who represents the same party interest as the late member". Which party interest Brookfield represented was not straightforward. He had been the Labor member for Sturt since the 1917 by-election, however he resigned from the Labor Party in August 1919, and joined the Industrial Socialist Labor Party, which in January 1920 merged with the Socialist Labor Party, retaining the later name. Under this banner Brookfield was the first candidate elected at the 1920 election for Sturt. He was however dissatisfied with the manner in which the affairs of that party have been carried on" and formed a new Industrial Labor Party in February 1921, shortly before his death. There was debate concerning who should be appointed. The Industrial Labor Party said that John O'Reilly should be appointed, while The Sydney Morning Herald stated that Thomas Hynes had the greater number of primary votes and thus he should be appointed. The nomination had to come from the recognised party leader according to votes on any censure motion and Labor leader John Storey nominated Jabez Wright.

1920

Elections in the 1910s

1917

1917 by-election

1913

1910

Elections in the 1900s

1908 by-election

1907

1904

1901

Elections in the 1890s

1898

1895

1894

1891

Elections in the 1880s

1889

Notes

References

New South Wales state electoral results by district